Patricia Buller (13 June 1929 – 18 April 2013) was a British fencer. She competed in the women's individual foil event at the 1952 Summer Olympics.

References

1929 births
2013 deaths
British female fencers
Olympic fencers of Great Britain
Fencers at the 1952 Summer Olympics